The 1997 New Jersey gubernatorial election was a race for Governor of New Jersey. It was held on November 4, 1997. In the Democratic primary state senator and Woodbridge Township mayor James McGreevey defeated pre-primary front-runner Rep. Rob Andrews by 9,993 votes. Although incumbent Republican Governor Christine Todd Whitman had a comfortable lead in polls in the run-up to the vote, on election night she prevailed over McGreevey by a narrow margin of 26,953 votes (1.05%), a similarly narrow margin to her previous election. 

Whitman won 46.87% of the vote, with Democratic nominee James McGreevey receiving 45.82% and Libertarian Murray Sabrin receiving 4.7%. This was the first gubernatorial election in the state since 1949 where a Republican won without Passaic County.

Republican primary

Candidates
Christine Todd Whitman, incumbent Governor of New Jersey

Results

Democratic primary

Candidates
Jim McGreevey, Mayor of Woodbridge Township and New Jersey State Senator
Rob Andrews, U.S. Representative
Michael Murphy, Morris County Prosecutor
Frank C. Marmo, perennial candidate

Results

General election

Candidates
James McGreevey (D), State Senator and Mayor of Woodbridge
Murray Sabrin (L), Ramapo College professor
Christine Todd Whitman (R), incumbent Governor

Campaign 
In June, a 60-second radio ad paid for by the New Jersey Republican Party focused on the 30% income tax cut and 180,000 new jobs. Whitman ads blamed McGreevey for the state's auto insurance rates. The Whitman campaign emphasized the drops in unemployment, violent crime and welfare rolls during her term. Other ads took aim at McGreevey's record on taxes, particularly his support for former Gov. Jim Florio's (D) tax increase. The RNC criticized former Gov. Jim Florio (D) in an ad October, calling his 1990 tax increase a result of electing "liberal Democrats".

In September, McGreevey unveiled two TV ads criticizing Whitman and focusing on property taxes, auto insurance rates, pension bond debts and education standards. The Democratic National Committee also spent $1 million during the home stretch of the campaign on television ads for Democratic candidates statewide.

Polling

Issues 
In October, a poll found that voters of NJ called auto insurance the most important issue in the campaign, and property taxes second.

Debates 
Three debates on October 18, 21 and 24, Whitman, McGreevey and Sabrin traded barbs on their dueling auto insurance plans, property taxes, state spending and the Atlantic City tunnel, a $215 million project for which a private investor gave $55 million.

Results

Results by County

Counties that flipped from Democratic to Republican
Atlantic (largest municipality: Egg Harbor Township)
Cape May (largest municipality: Lower Township)

Counties that flipped from Republican to Democratic
Burlington (largest municipality: Evesham)
Mercer (largest municipality: Hamilton Township)
Passaic (largest municipality: Paterson)

Notes

References

1997
Gubernatorial
New Jersey
November 1997 events in the United States